Nummus (noummos), plural nummi  is a Latin term meaning 'coin', but used technically by modern writers for a range of low-value copper coins issued by the Roman and Byzantine empires during Late Antiquity. It comes from the Greek nomos via its Western Doric form noummos, which was used to describe a coin in some parts of southern Italy. The word was also used during the later years of the Roman Republic and the early Empire, either as a general word for a coin, or to describe the sestertius, which was the standard unit for keeping accounts.

History

In circa 294 AD, during the Tetrarchy, a new large bronze coin of circa 10 grams weight and 30 mm diameter appeared. Its official name was apparently nummus, although it has until recently been known among numismatists as the follis. The term nummus is now usually applied solely to the 5th–7th century Byzantine issues. These were small, badly struck coins, weighing less than 1 gram, forming the lowest denomination of Byzantine coinage. They were valued officially at 1⁄7,200 of the gold solidus but more usually rated to 1⁄6,000 or 1⁄12,000. The nummus usually featured the profile of the reigning Byzantine emperor on the obverse and the Byzantine imperial monogram on the reverse, although some coins of Emperor Justinian I (r. 527–565) display its numerical value by the Greek numeral "A" instead.

Higher denominations 
In 498, Emperor Anastasius I (r. 491–518) reformed the coinage (carried out by the comes sacrarum largitionum John the Paphlagonian) by introducing multiples of the nummus, with denominations of 40 nummi, also known as a follis, 20 nummi (semifollis), 10 nummi (Greek: δεκανούμμιον, decanummium). These were also marked with Greek numerals representing their value: "M" for the follis, "K" for the semifollis and "I" for the decanummium. On the other hand, it appears that issue of the simple nummus was discontinued. In 513, the weights of these coins were doubled, the pentanummium (Greek: πεντανούμμιον, 5-nummi coin marked with "E") introduced, and the minting of single nummi resumed.

Decreasing value 
In 538–539, Emperor Justinian I introduced further changes to the 40-nummi follis, raising its weight to 25 grams. It was reduced again to 22.5 grams in 541/542, and further reductions followed until the century's end. At this time, a new 30-nummi coin (marked with "Λ" or "XXX") was introduced, but the single follis had ceased to be struck at Constantinople. It survived in the Exarchate of Carthage well into the 7th century however. During the 7th century, the successive military and financial crises led to further reduction in the weight and a marked deterioration of the quality of bronze coinage; by the time of Emperor Constans II (r. 641–668), a follis weighed only 3 grams. Consequently, the denominations lower than the semifollis were practically unmintable and abandoned. Thereafter, the term nummus remained in use as a notional unit for 1⁄6,000 of the solidus, and in colloquial usage for "small change".

Use of term

Variations of the term nummus appear in medical language, plant taxonomy, and fossil taxonomy:
Arctostaphylos nummularia
Atriplex nummularia
Biscogniauxia nummularia
Bulbophyllum nummularioides
Capparis spinosa subsp. nummularia
Correa reflexa var. nummulariifolia
Dorstenia nummularia
Eriogonum nummulare
Helianthemum nummularium
Lysimachia nummularia
Nummular dermatitis
Nummulite
Pilea nummulariifolia
Ziziphus nummularia

References

Citations

Sources

Further reading

Coins of ancient Rome
Coins of the Byzantine Empire
Bronze coins